Amytis of Media (c. 540s-c. 520s BCE;;;) was a Queen consort of the ancient Persian Achaemenid Empire. She was the daughter of the Median king Astyages, and the wife of Cyrus II.

Name
The female name  is the Latinised form of the Greek name , which perhaps may reflect (with vowel metathesis) an Median and Persian , meaning "having good thought," and which is an equivalent of the Avestan term .

Life
Amytis was the daughter of the Median king Astyages. Amytis had a paternal aunt, also named Amytis, who the sister Astyages and was married to the king Nebuchadnezzar II of Babylon.

Amytis was married to Spitamas, who was a Median grandee and the prospective successor of Astyages.

After Astyages was overthrown by Persian Cyrus, who was his own grandson through his daughter Mandane, and therefore was the nephew of Amytis, Cyrus killed Spitamas and married Amytis to legitimise his rule.

After the murder of Tanyoxarces, Amytis demanded the extradition of his murder from Cyrus's son and successor, Cambyses II. When her demands were not met, she committed suicide by drinking poison.

References

Sources

 

Median people
Persian people
6th-century BC women
Queens of the Achaemenid Empire
6th-century BC Iranian people